Washington Charter Township, located within Metro Detroit, is a charter township of Macomb County in the U.S. state of Michigan. The population was 25,139 at the 2010 census. Washington Township is bordered by the village of Romeo as well as Ray Township, Shelby Township, and Oakland Township in Oakland County and is 18 miles north of Detroit.

Communities
Clifton Mills is an unincorporated community near the intersection of 31 Mile Rd. and Mt. Vernon Rd. (Elevation:  853 ft./260 m.).
Mount Vernon is an unincorporated community in the southwest portion of the township at Mt. Vernon and 28 Mile Roads (Elevation: 830 ft./253 m.).
Romeo is a village in the northeast corner of the township. Most of the village is in adjacent Bruce Township.
Located at the intersection of North 26 Mile Rd. and VanDyke Ave.

History
Westview Orchards was founded in what is now Washington Township in 1813.

Washington Township was organized in 1827. It is home to the historic Octagon House, built by Loren Andrus from 1858 to 1860.

Government
The Township has a Supervisor-Board style township government with elected supervisor, clerk, treasurer and four trustees.
School district serving the Township residents are Romeo Community Schools and Utica Community Schools and Rochester Schools from Oakland County.

Geography
According to the United States Census Bureau, the township has a total area of 36.8 square miles (95.3 km2), of which 36.0 square miles (93.1 km2) is land and 0.9 square mile (2.2 km2) (2.34%) is water.

Weather
Weather in Washington Township (an outer suburb of Detroit) is similar to Detroit, generally being only a few degrees cooler allowing for more snow in the winter.

A notable weather event occurred on July 2, 1997 when, during the Michigan Tornado Outbreak, an F0 tornado touched down at 26 mile Road and destroyed parts of the east village estates trailer park community. Six people were injured during the events.

Demographics
As of the census of 2010, there were 25,139 people (up from 19,080 in 2000), 9,258 households, and 7,160 families residing in the township. There were 9,258 occupied housing units and 612 vacant units. The racial makeup of the township was 94.8% White, 1.6% African American, 0.2% Native American, 1.0% Asian, 0.04% Pacific Islander, 1.0% from other races, and 1.3% from two or more races. Hispanic or Latino of any race were 3.9% of the population.

There were 9,258 households, out of which 32.9% had children under the age of 18 living with them, 64.9% were married couples living together, 8.9% had a female householder with no husband present, and 22.7% were non-families. 19.2% of all households were made up of individuals, and 7.6% had someone living alone who was 65 years of age or older. The average household size was 2.70 and the average family size was 3.11.

In the township the population was spread out, with 25.0% under the age of 18, 7.3% from 18 to 24, 23.3% from 25 to 44, 30.3% from 45 to 64, and 14.1% who were 65 years of age or older.  The median age was 41 years. For every 100 females, there were 97.8 males.  For every 100 females age 18 and over, there were 94.7 males.

The median income for a household in the township was $68,841 in 2000 and $83,348 in 2016; the median income for a family was $78,988 in 2000 and $94,057 in 2016. In 2000, males had a median income of $60,721 versus $31,213 for females. The per capita income for the township was $38,657.  About 5.7% of families and 7.1% of the population were below the poverty line (up from 2.8% of families and 3.7% of all individuals in 2000), including 9.6% of those under age 18 (up from 5.0% in 2000) and 5.9% of those age 65 or over (up from 2.7% in 2000).

References

External links 

 Charter Township of Washington

Townships in Macomb County, Michigan
Charter townships in Michigan
1827 establishments in Michigan Territory
Populated places established in 1827